The 1996–97 First League of FR Yugoslavia was the fifth season of the FR Yugoslavia's top-level football league since its establishment.

Overview 
For the fourth season in a raw that the league was divided in 2 groups, A and B, consisting each of 10 clubs. Both groups were played in league system. By winter break all clubs in each group meet each other twice, home and away, with the bottom four classified from A group moving to the group B, and being replaced by the top four from the B group. At the end of the season the same situation happened with four teams being replaced from A and B groups, adding the fact that the bottom three clubs from the B group were relegated into the Second League of FR Yugoslavia for the next season and replaced by the top three from that league.

At the end of the season FK Partizan were the champions in the second consecutive year.

The league top-scorer was Red Star Belgrade striker Zoran Jovičić with 21 goals.

The relegated clubs were OFK Kikinda, FK Sloboda Užice and FK Mladost Bački Jarak.

Teams

1A League

1B League

IA league

Table

Results

First and second round

Third round

IB league

Table

Results

First and second round

Third round

IA/IB Playoff

Relegation playoff

Winning squad
Champions: Partizan Belgrade (Coach: Ljubiša Tumbaković)

Players (league matches/league goals)
 Ivica Kralj (goalkeeper)
 Nikola Damjanac (goalkeeper)
 Viktor Trenevski
 Bratislav Mijalković
 Darko Tešović
 Gjorgji Hristov
 Ivan Tomić
 Dražen Bolić
 Mladen Krstajić
 Predrag Pažin
 Đorđe Svetličić
 Dejan Peković
 Dejan Vukićević
 Damir Čakar
 Dragan Ćirić
 Niša Saveljić
 Igor Taševski
Source:

Top goalscorers

References

External links 
 Tables and results at RSSSF

Yugoslav First League seasons
Yugo
1996–97 in Yugoslav football